Pigeon Boy is a children's cartoon created by Millimages of France, and is shown on a number of television networks, including the Australian Broadcasting Corporation in Australia. It is set in the fictional city of Ultrapolis and centres on the lives of three teenagers: Pigeon Boy, and his two friends, Arthur and Chloe.

Plot
The cartoon is about a 14- or 15-year-old named Randolf, or Randy to his friends, whose town's pigeons transform him into a mysterious, comical, and lovable hero named Pigeon Boy. The pigeons spy on the town residents without being noticed very much. When they see something fishy is going on in the city, they summon Pigeon Boy. Only Randy's two best friends, Arthur and Chloe know about this hero side of him, but they don't tell him that they know; if Randy is aware that any one knows, he has vowed to give up the hero within him and never save his town again.

Major characters
Pigeon Boy, aka Randolf Dove
Arthur, best friends with Randolf and knows about his secret hero side
Chloe, best friends with Randolf and knows about his secret hero side
Bruno Glibstone, the bully at Randy's school, son of Victor Glibstone
Mr. Dove, Randolf's lawyer dad
Mrs. Dove, Randolf's doctor mum
Lilly, mother of Arthur

Episodes
26 episodes of the show have been made. They include:
Oil Slick
The Evergreens
Milo's Venus
and
White Christmas

References

External links 
 Official site
 (French version)
 

French children's animated comedy television series
French children's animated superhero television series
Fictional Columbidae